Sonqor (also Romanized as Sonqor and Sanqor; also known as Sungur and Sūnqūr) is a village in Bughda Kandi Rural District, in the Central District of Zanjan County, Zanjan Province, Iran. At the 2006 census, its population was 175, in 36 families.

References 

Populated places in Zanjan County